Vlasis Kazakis (born 17 June 1983) is a Greek former professional footballer who played as a forward.

Career

Kazakis began his career as a professional footballer in Skoda Xanthi in 2002. Until 2008 he competed in Super League with Skoda Xanthi. In 2008–2009 he competed for Ethnikos Piraeus and Atromitos in Beta Ethniki. In 2009–2010 he competed again in Super League with Panthrakikos. In 2011, he joined again Skoda Xanthi, but didn't spend much time there. On 15 August 2012, Kalloni F.C. announced his transfer to the team of Lesbos island, which participates in the Football League (Greece).

Career statistics

Date of last update: 15 Aug 2012

References

External links

Panthraxstats
Guardian Football

1983 births
Living people
Greek footballers
Super League Greece players
Football League (Greece) players
Xanthi F.C. players
Ethnikos Piraeus F.C. players
Atromitos F.C. players
Panthrakikos F.C. players
AEL Kalloni F.C. players
Aiginiakos F.C. players
Kavala F.C. players
Association football forwards
Footballers from Komotini